Amanda Mackey (September 22, 1951 – August 27, 2022) was an American casting director. She worked as a casting director on many films from the 1980s to the 2020s, including The Fugitive, Olympus Has Fallen, The Proposal, Rocky IV, The Hunt for Red October, Ronin, Holes, and Those Who Wish Me Dead. In 2014, she was nominated for a Primetime Emmy Award in the category Outstanding Casting for a Miniseries, Movie or a Special for the television film The Normal Heart. She shared the nomination with Cathy Sandrich Gelfond. Mackey died on August 27, 2022, in Brooklyn after battling myelodysplastic syndrome. She was 70.

References

External links

1951 births
2022 deaths
American casting directors
Women casting directors
People from New York City